Taffy is a nickname for:

 Clarence Taffy Abel (1900–1964), first American-born player to become a National Hockey League regular player
 Edward George Bowen (1911–1991), Welsh physicist and radio astronomer who helped develop radar
 William Taffy Davies (1910–1995), Welsh footballer
 Herbert Jones (footballer, born 1896) (1896–1973), English footballer
 Mary Taffy Nivert (born 1944), American songwriter and singer, member of the Starland Vocal Band
 Eugene Taffy O'Callaghan (1906–1946), Welsh footballer
 Isaac Taffy Spelman (1914–?), English footballer
 Hendrick Waye, Australian rules footballer in the early 1900s
 Hugh Taffy Williams (1933–1996), Welsh mercenary
 Tafara Taffy Mupariwa (born 1996), a Zimbabwean cricketer
 Taft Taffy Wright (1911–1981), American Major League Baseball player

Lists of people by nickname